The 2020 Rally Mexico (also known as the Rally Guanajuato Mexico 2020) was a motor racing event for rally cars that was held over four days between 12 and 15 March 2020. It marked the seventeenth running of Rally Mexico and was the third round of the 2020 World Rally Championship, World Rally Championship-2 and World Rally Championship-3. The 2020 event was based in the town of León in Guanajuato and consists of eleven special stages.

Sébastien Ogier and Julien Ingrassia were the defending rally winners. Citroën World Rally Team, the team they drove for in 2019, were the reigning manufacturers' winners, but were not defending their title after parent company Citroën withdrew from the sport. Łukasz Pieniążek and Kamil Heller were the defending winners in the World Rally Championship-2 category, but they did not compete the rally. In the World Rally Championship-3 category, Local privateers Benito Guerra and Jaime Zapata were the reigning rally winners.

Ogier and Ingrassia successfully defended their titles, clinching their sixth Mexico win. Their team, Toyota Gazoo Racing WRT, were the manufacturers' winners. Pontus Tidemand and Patrick Barth were the winners in the WRC-2 category. Marco Bulacia Wilkinson and Giovanni Bernacchini were the winners in the WRC-3 category, winning their first victory in the class.

Background

Championship standings prior to the event

Elfyn Evans and Scott Martin entered the round as championships leaders. Thierry Neuville and Nicolas Gilsoul were second, albeit they were level on points. Six-time world champions Sébastien Ogier and Julien Ingrassia were third, a slender five points behind. In the World Rally Championship for Manufacturers, Toyota Gazoo Racing WRT held a ten-point lead over defending manufacturers' champions Hyundai Shell Mobis WRT, following by M-Sport Ford WRT.

In the World Rally Championship-2 standings, Mads Østberg and Torstein Eriksen held a twenty-point lead ahead of Adrien Fourmaux and Renaud Jamoul in the drivers' and co-drivers' standings respectively, with Nikolay Gryazin and Yaroslav Fedorov in third. In the manufacturer' championship, M-Sport Ford WRT led PH-Sport by two points.

In the World Rally Championship-3 standings, the crew of Eric Camilli and François-Xavier Buresi, and Jari Huttunen and Mikko Lukka tied in the standings. They led drivers' and co-drivers' standings by seven points respectively, ahead of Nicolas Ciamin and Yannick Roche.

Entry list
The following crews entered into the rally. The event was open to crews competing in the World Rally Championship, its support categories, the World Rally Championship-2, World Rally Championship-3, and Junior World Rally Championship and privateer entries that were not registered to score points in any championship. Forty entries were received, with ten crews entered in World Rally Cars, three Group R5 cars entered in the World Rally Championship-2 and eleven in the World Rally Championship-3.

Route
All the stages are located in the state of Guanajuato. The final day of the rally was cancelled in response to increased travel restrictions stemming from the COVID-19 pandemic. As such, the rally concluded following stage 21, with full points awarded at the end of Saturday.

Itinerary
All dates and times are CST (UTC-6).

Impact of the coronavirus pandemic

The rally was run during the COVID-19 coronavirus pandemic, and came at a time when a series of motorsport events—including Rally Argentina, rounds of the 2020 Formula One World Championship, 2019-20 World Endurance Championship, 2020 World Rallycross Championship and 2020 World Touring Car Cup—were either postponed or cancelled. Organisers of the rally decided to shorten the itinerary by cancelling the final leg of the event. This was done to allow teams time to pack up their equipment and return to their headquarters before a series of travel bans were imposed by European countries trying to manage the virus.

Report

World Rally Cars
It was a nightmare Friday for the Hyundai squad. An early radiator pipe issue Dani Sordo and Carlos del Barrio cost them over five minutes, and a late terminal engine issue sent the Spanish crew out of the rally; Ott Tänak and Martin Järveoja dropped over forty seconds when they picked up damage to the rear-right corner after leading the rally shortly; Thierry Neuville and Nicolas Gilsoul was running third overall, but they had to retire from the day with electrical gremlins. One more major retirement came from Esapekka Lappi and Janne Ferm when their Fiesta caught fire. Six-time world champions Sébastien Ogier and Julien Ingrassia managed to stay out of dramas, and won his first rally of the season after the rally ended prematurely.

Classification

Special stages

Championship standings

World Rally Championship-2
Pontus Tidemand and Patrick Barth dominated the rally, winning their first rally in the season.

Classification

Special stages

Championship standings

World Rally Championship-3
Marco Bulacia Wilkinson and Giovanni Bernacchini led the category, and eventually won their maiden victory in the class. Early leaders Oliver Solberg and Aaron Johnston retired from the rally when they hit a rock and smashed his Polo's sump.

Classification

Special stages

Championship standings

Notes

References

External links

  
 2020 Rally Mexico at ewrc-results.com
 The official website of the World Rally Championship

2020 in Mexican motorsport
Mexico
March 2020 sports events in Mexico
2020
Sports events curtailed due to the COVID-19 pandemic